Owen M. Fiss (born 1938) is an American professor who is a Sterling Professor emeritus at Yale Law School.

Biography
Born in the Bronx, N.Y., Fiss received his B.A. degree from Dartmouth College in 1959, B.Phil. from Oxford University in 1961, and LL.B. from Harvard Law School in 1964.

After graduation from law school, Fiss was admitted to the bar in New York state in 1965.  He clerked for U.S. Court of Appeals Judge Thurgood Marshall from 1964 to 1965, and for U.S. Supreme Court Justice William Brennan in 1965.  He then worked as a Special Assistant to Assistant Attorney General of the Civil Rights Division of the Department of Justice from 1966 to 1968.

Fiss joined the faculty  of University of Chicago in 1968, and became a professor at Yale Law School in 1976.

Courses offered by Fiss include civil procedure, distributive justice, the law of democracy and the First Amendment.

Brian Leiter's law school ratings rank Owen Fiss as one of the top 20 most-cited professors in constitutional law.

Campaign finance reform

Fiss is an advocate of strong regulation of political campaigns:
We may sometimes find it necessary to "restrict the speech of some elements of our society in order to enhance the relative voice of others," and that unless the [Supreme] Court allows, and sometimes even requires the state to do so, we as a people will never truly be free.

Works
 The Civil Rights Injunction, 1978
 Troubled Beginnings of the Modern State, 1888-1910, 1993
 Liberalism Divided, 1996
 The Irony of Free Speech, 1996
 A Community of Equals, 1999
 A Way Out: America's Ghettos and the Legacy of Racism, 2003
 The Law As It Could Be, 2003
 A War Like No Other: The Constitution in a Time of Terror, 2015
 Pillars of Justice, 2017

See also 
 List of law clerks of the Supreme Court of the United States (Seat 3)

References

External links
Fiss's profile at Yale Law School

1938 births
Living people
People from the Bronx
Dartmouth College alumni
Harvard Law School alumni
Law clerks of the Supreme Court of the United States
Yale Law School faculty
Yale Sterling Professors
American legal scholars